Robert J. Naiman (born 31 July 1947) is a professor in both the School of Aquatic and Fishery Sciences and the College of Forest Resources at the University of Washington in Seattle.  He also holds the UNESCO Chair in Sustainable Rivers at the University of Washington. Dr. Naiman was designated Eminent Ecologist by the Ecological Society of America in 2012.

Dr. Naiman is best known for his work on the ecology of rivers and riparian areas.  His work to understand the biogeochemical cycling and role of animals in altering river and riparian systems have been particularly influential.  Dr. Naiman started researching the Queets River in Washington state in 1992 and has since been nicknamed "Dr. Queets" by the Seattle press from his continuing research on that river.

Education 
Bachelor of Science, Zoology, 1969, California State Polytechnic UniversityMaster of Arts, Zoology and Ichthyology, 1971, University of California, Los Angeles Doctor of Philosophy, Zoology and Ecosystem Science, 1974, Arizona State UniversityHonorary Doctor of Philosophy, Université Paul Sabatier (Toulouse, France)

Key appointments 
UNESCO Chair in Sustainable RiversCoastal Rivers Research Consortium (CRRC)
 Chair, Organizing Committee

DIVERSITAS International (Paris, France)
 Chair, FreshwaterBIODIVERSITY
 Member, Scientific Advisory Committee
 Member, U.S. National Committee

UNESCO International Hydrology Programme (Paris, France)
 Chair, IHP/MAB Ecohydrology Programme

Robert W. Woodruff Foundation - J.W. Jones Ecological Research Center
 Scientific Advisor

Global Water System Project (GWSP; Bonn, Germany)
 Member, Executive Committee
 Member, Scientific Advisory Committee

References

1947 births
Living people
University of Washington faculty
Fellows of the Ecological Society of America